This is a list of the men's national basketball teams in the world. There are more than 200 national basketball teams, the second sport with more national teams, with teams representing all UN member states except Liechtenstein, as well as several dependent territories, sub-national entities and states who are not members of the United Nations.

This list excludes other teams, which generally play outside FIBA's recognition. Excluded teams include those who represent ethnic groups, sub-national entities and dependent territories other than those recognized by FIBA or its confederations, competitors at the Island Games, unrecognized states, separatist movements, and pseudo or micronations.

Members of FIBA affiliated confederations 

This section lists the current 213 men's national basketball teams affiliated to FIBA, through their national basketball associations. FIBA members are eligible to enter the FIBA Basketball World Cup and matches between them are recognized as official international matches.

The five confederations are:
 Africa – FIBA Africa
 Americas – FIBA Americas
 Asia – FIBA Asia
 Europe – FIBA Europe
 Oceania – FIBA Oceania

FIBA runs the World Cup as a tournament for national teams to find the world champion. Each confederation also runs its own championship to find the best team from among its members:
Africa – AfroBasket
Americas – FIBA AmeriCup
Asia – FIBA Asia Cup
Oceania – FIBA Oceania Championship
Europe – EuroBasket

Members of FIBA include a majority of United Nations member states, as well as one state that is an observer at the United Nations (Palestine). They also include several constituent countries, autonomous areas, associated states, dependent territories, and two sovereign states who are neither UN members or observers (Kosovo and the Republic of China). The team from the Republic of China is designated as "Chinese Taipei" by both FIBA and its affiliated continental confederations.

FIBA Africa

FIBA Africa, which has 54 national teams, is divided into 7 zones.

Zone 1
  (1963)
  (1961)
  (1936)
  (1956)

Zone 2
  (1988)
  (1972)
  (1962)
  (1994)
  (1961)
  (1964)
  (1962)
  (1991)

Zone 3
  (1962)
  (1964)
  (1962)
  (1962)
  (1964)
  (1963)
  (1964)
  (1963)

Zone 4
  (1965)
  (1963)
  (1963)
  (1962)
  (1963)
  (1994)
  (1965)
  (1983)

Zone 5
  (1994)
  (1934)
  (1997)
  (1949)
  (1965)
  (1977)
  (1960)
  (2013)
  (1953)
  (1963)
  (1963)

Zone 6
  (1979)
  (1997)
  (2000)
  (1997)
  (1988)
  (1978)
  (1995)
  (1992)
  (1962)
  (1962)

Zone 7
  (1995)
  (1979)
  (1963)
  (1959)
  (1979)

FIBA Americas

FIBA Americas (formerly the Pan-American Basketball Confederation), which controls North America, Central America, the Caribbean, and South America, has 43 national teams, divided into three areas. The Central American and Caribbean Confederations of Basketball (CONCECABA) is further divided into the Central America and Caribbean zone.

Caribbean

Central America

North America

South America

FIBA Asia

FIBA Asia (formerly the Asian Basketball Confederation) is divided into 6 zones and has 44 national teams.

Central Asia

East Asia

Gulf

South Asia

Southeast Asia

West Asia

FIBA Europe

FIBA Europe has 50 member nations under it.

 
 
 
 
 
 
 
 
 
 
 
 
 
 
 
 
 

 
 
 
 
 
 
 
 
 
 
 
 
 
 
 
 
 

  
 
 
 
 
 
 
 
 
 
 
 
 
 
 
 

, a combined team of England, Scotland and Wales, competed in Eurobasket 2009 and played at the 2012 Olympics. Starting September 30, 2016, England, Scotland and Wales rescinded their FIBA memberships and operate internationally as the British Basketball Federation.

FIBA Oceania
FIBA Oceania has 22 member nations under it.

Non-affiliated teams

Former teams 
  - split into two teams; no team carried over the records of Czechoslovakia
 
 
  - merged into
 ; West Germany assumes the records of a unified  team
  - merged into
 ; North Vietnam assumes the records of a unified  team
  - merged into
 ; North Yemen assumes the records of a unified  team
  - split into 15 different national teams; no team carried over the records of the Soviet Union.

The three Baltic states and Russia which played international basketball prior to 1945 inherited their old records prior to being merged with :

The Unified Team (a.k.a. the Commonwealth of Independent States (CIS) team) for the 1992 Summer Olympics was a one-off team.
  - merger of two teams;
 
 
 Later split into two teams:
  retained its old records as Syria.
  (later renamed as Egypt) retained the old records as Egypt
  - split into five teams; no team carried over the records of Yugoslavia.
 
 
 
 
  - split into two teams
 
 ; retained Serbia and Montenegro's records. A team later split from Serbia:
 
  - replaced by:

FIBA country codes
FIBA uses IOC country codes for most countries which are IOC members. For non-IOC members and exceptions, FIBA uses the following codes:
: ENG
: GIB
: MIS (IOC: MHL)
: MAT
: CAL
: NIS
: SAI
: SCO
: TAH
: TCI
: WAL

See also
 List of women's national basketball teams

References